The Baker Street Library, is a library located at 1400 Baker St. in Bakersfield, California. The library was constructed from 1913 to 1915 and replaced Bakersfield's original library building. Architect O. L. Clark designed the building in the Classical Revival style; the library is the only surviving building designed by Clark in Bakersfield. The library is designed as a central block with two wings at the east and west ends. The library's main entrance is located on the east wing; the entrance is a portico supported by columns and topped with a pediment and a frieze reading "PUBLIC LIBRARY". The ornate interior decorations incorporate classical and Renaissance themes.

The library was added to the National Register of Historic Places on April 1, 1981.

See also
 Bakersfield Register of Historic Places and Areas of Historic Interest
California Historical Landmarks in Kern County, California
National Register of Historic Places listings in Kern County, California

References

External links
Library website

Buildings and structures in Bakersfield, California
Education in Kern County, California
Public libraries in California
Library buildings completed in 1915
Libraries on the National Register of Historic Places in California
National Register of Historic Places in Kern County, California
Beaux-Arts architecture in California
Neoclassical architecture in California